Jail House Blues is a 1942 American comedy film directed by Albert S. Rogell and written by Paul Gerard Smith and Harold Tarshis. The film stars Nat Pendleton, Anne Gwynne, Robert Paige, Horace McMahon, Elisabeth Risdon, Warren Hymer, and Samuel S. Hinds. It was released on February 1, 1942, by Universal Pictures.

Plot
Sonny McGann is a convict who takes his duty of organising the prison's upcoming convict show very seriously, however he his about to be paroled against his will. It doesn't take long until he finds his way back to jail, but now he takes some additions to the show's cast.

Cast        
Nat Pendleton as Sonny McGann
Anne Gwynne as Doris Daniels
Robert Paige as Cliff Bailey
Horace McMahon as Swifty
Elisabeth Risdon as Mrs. Alyosius McGonigle McGann
Warren Hymer as Big Foot Louie
Samuel S. Hinds as Mr. Thomas Daniels
Cliff Clark as Warden Boswell
John Kelly as Snork
Reed Hadley as Boston
Paul Fix as Danny
Dewey Robinson as Liverlip

References

External links
 

1942 films
1940s English-language films
American comedy films
1942 comedy films
Universal Pictures films
Films directed by Albert S. Rogell
American black-and-white films
1940s American films